Brian Michael Key (20 September 1947 – 20 January 2016) was a British Labour Party politician, who from 1979 to 1984 was the Member of the European Parliament (MEP) for Yorkshire South.

He was educated at Wath Grammar School from 1958 to 1965, before studying PPE at the University of Liverpool, where he was a contemporary of the journalist Jon Snow. Key was elected to Barnsley Metropolitan Borough Council in 1973, serving for six years until his election to the European Parliament in 1979. During his tenure on Barnsley Council, Key served as Chair of the Labour Group and a member of the Education committee.

Following his deselection as a candidate in the 1984 European Parliament elections, he worked as a Local Government Officer and School Auditor, before his retirement.

Between 2011 and 2015, Key represented his home village of Darfield on Barnsley Council, before retiring prior to the 2015 local elections. Soon after retiring as a councillor, Key died at the age of 68.

References

1947 births
2016 deaths
MEPs for England 1979–1984
Labour Party (UK) MEPs
Labour Party (UK) councillors
Councillors in South Yorkshire
People educated at Wath Academy